Koromiko is a locality in Marlborough, New Zealand. State Highway 1 runs through the area.

Picton Aerodrome is located at Koromiko. It has flights to and from Wellington several times a day operated by Sounds Air.

Education
Koromiko School was a coeducational full primary (years 1–8) school. It was founded in 1873, and closed at the beginning of 2013.

References

Populated places in the Marlborough Region